{{DISPLAYTITLE:3 31 honeycomb}}

In 7-dimensional geometry, the 331 honeycomb is a uniform honeycomb, also given by Schläfli symbol {3,3,3,33,1} and is composed of 321 and 7-simplex facets, with 56 and 576 of them respectively around each vertex.

Construction

It is created by a Wythoff construction upon a set of 8 hyperplane mirrors in 7-dimensional space.

The facet information can be extracted from its Coxeter-Dynkin diagram.
 

Removing the node on the short branch leaves the 6-simplex facet:
 

Removing the node on the end of the 3-length branch leaves the 321 facet:
 

The vertex figure is determined by removing the ringed node and ringing the neighboring node. This makes 231 polytope.
 

The edge figure is determined by removing the ringed node and ringing the neighboring node. This makes 6-demicube (131).
 

The face figure is determined by removing the ringed node and ringing the neighboring node. This makes rectified 5-simplex (031).
 

The cell figure is determined by removing the ringed node of the face figure and ringing the neighboring nodes. This makes tetrahedral prism {}×{3,3}.

Kissing number 

Each vertex of this tessellation is the center of a 6-sphere in the densest known packing in 7 dimensions; its kissing number is 126, represented by the vertices of its vertex figure 231.

E7 lattice 
The 331 honeycomb's vertex arrangement is called the E7 lattice.

 contains  as a subgroup of index 144.

The E7 lattice can also be expressed as a union of the vertices of two A7 lattices, also called A72:
 =  ∪ 

The E7* lattice (also called E72) has double the symmetry, represented by [[3,33,3]]. The Voronoi cell of the E7* lattice is the 132 polytope, and voronoi tessellation the 133 honeycomb. The E7* lattice is constructed by 2 copies of the E7 lattice vertices, one from each long branch of the Coxeter diagram, and can be constructed as the union of four A7* lattices, also called A74:

Related honeycombs 

It is in a dimensional series of uniform polytopes and honeycombs, expressed by Coxeter as 3k1 series. A degenerate 4-dimensional case exists as 3-sphere tiling, a tetrahedral hosohedron.

See also 
 8-polytope
 133 honeycomb

References 

 H. S. M. Coxeter, Regular Polytopes, 3rd Edition, Dover New York, 1973 
 Coxeter The Beauty of Geometry: Twelve Essays, Dover Publications, 1999,  (Chapter 3: Wythoff's Construction for Uniform Polytopes)
 Kaleidoscopes: Selected Writings of H.S.M. Coxeter, edited by F. Arthur Sherk, Peter McMullen, Anthony C. Thompson, Asia Ivic Weiss, Wiley-Interscience Publication, 1995,   GoogleBook
 (Paper 24) H.S.M. Coxeter, Regular and Semi-Regular Polytopes III, [Math. Zeit. 200 (1988) 3–45]
 R. T. Worley, The Voronoi Region of E7*.  SIAM J. Discrete Math., 1.1 (1988), 134-141. 
 p124-125, 8.2 The 7-dimensinoal lattices: E7 and E7*
 

8-polytopes